Patricia Ford may refer to:
Patricia Ford (politician) (1921–1995), Member of Parliament from Northern Ireland
Patricia A. Ford (born 1955), American physician

See also
Patricia Forde (born c. 1960), former director of the Galway Arts Festival and children's author
Pat Ford (disambiguation)